Winter in Eden is a 1986 science fiction novel by American author Harry Harrison, the second in the Eden series.

It tells an alternate history of planet Earth in which the extinction of the dinosaurs never occurred. The story began in West of Eden, which depicts a war between a group of Cro-Magnon-level humans that evolved from New World monkeys and a reptilian race called the Yilanè, who are descended from the prehistoric mosasaur and have become the dominant lifeform on the planet. The central characters from the first book return: Vaintè, an ambitious Yilanè, and Kerrick, a "ustuzou" (the Yilanè word for mammal) who was captured by the Yilanè as a boy, raised as a Yilanè, and eventually escapes to rejoin his own people and burn the Yilanè colony city.

The trilogy continues with Return to Eden.

Plot
In Winter in Eden, Kerrick and Herilak (fellow chieftain) searches the burned Alpèsak and discovers two Yilanè males. Herilak and Armun (wife of Kerrick) go north, while Kerrick stays in the city to learn more about the Yilanè. The reptiloids use their mastery of biology to drive them off and reconquer the city. Meanwhile, Enge, her fellows and an old, grumpy scientist establishes a city in South America. Vaintè allies Lanefenuu, leader of another city. Together they attempt to eradicate humans. After several unsuccessful attempts, they corner Herilak and the tribes in a valley. Kerrick and Armun try to find each other and finally end up with the Paramutan (northern whale hunter humanoids). They return and find a safe haven at a small lake with their own child, some humans and the two Yilanè males. Later, Kerrick and Armun travel to the Paramutan again, and with their help Kerrick manages to blackmail Lanefenuu to withdraw Vaintè and make peace. Vaintè initially obeys, but later defies efforts to make peace with the humans, so Lanefenuu banishes her.

Reception
Dave Langford reviewed Winter in Eden for White Dwarf #99, and stated that " These are tricks and turns of mere short-story weight, while the epic potential lies elsewhere: with the long-term inevitability of either human/dinosaur coexistence or one species' extinction, with the advancing glaciers that can't be conveniently bluffed or set fire to."

Reviews
Review by Arthur O. Lewis (1986) in Fantasy Review, October 1986
Review by Mark Greener (1986) in Vector 135
Review by C. J. Henderson [as by Chris Henderson] (1987) in Starlog, February 1987
Review by Everett F. Bleiler [as by E. F. Bleiler] (1987) in Rod Serling's The Twilight Zone Magazine, February 1987
Review by Thomas A. Easton [as by Tom Easton] (1987) in Analog Science Fiction/Science Fact, March 1987
Review by Don D'Ammassa (1987) in Science Fiction Chronicle, #95 August 1987
Review by Phil Nichols (1988) in Paperback Inferno, #70
Review [German] by Christian Hoffmann (2018) in phantastisch!, #72

References

External links
 Winter in Eden page on Official website

1986 American novels
1986 science fiction novels
American science fiction novels
American alternate history novels
Irish science fiction novels
Irish alternative history novels
Novels by Harry Harrison
Novels about dinosaurs
Novels set in prehistory
Bantam Books books